Joseph Salvatore Signaigo (February 9, 1923January 16, 2007) was a professional American football guard in the All-America Football Conference (AAFC) and the National Football League (NFL). He played for the AAFC's New York Yankees (1948–1949) and the NFL's New York Yanks (1950).

External links

1923 births
2007 deaths
Players of American football from Memphis, Tennessee
American football offensive guards
Notre Dame Fighting Irish football players
New York Yankees (AAFC) players
New York Yanks players